Amaryawa is a village in Jigawa State of Nigeria. Amaryawa is located in Roni Local government area.

Sources 

Populated places in Jigawa State